Tiruchirappalli (East) is a constituency of Tamil Nadu Legislative Assembly located in Tiruchirappalli district of Tamil Nadu. Its State Assembly Constituency number is 141. It was called as Tiruchirappalli – II before the constituency delimitations 2008.
It comes under Tiruchirappalli Lok Sabha constituency for Parliament elections. It includes Ward Nos. 8- 26, 33- 35, 37 and 38 of Tiruchirappalli City Municipal Corporation . It is one of the 234 State Legislative Assembly Constituencies in Tamil Nadu.

Members of Legislative Assembly

Election Results

2021

2016

References 

Assembly constituencies of Tamil Nadu
Government of Tiruchirappalli